Several Canadian naval units have been named HMCS Restigouche.
  (I) was a River-class destroyer originally commissioned as  until transfer to the Royal Canadian Navy in 1938.
  (II) was the lead ship of the  that served in the RCN and Canadian Forces.

Battle honours
 Atlantic 1939–45
 North Sea 1940
 Mediterranean 1943
 Normandy 1944
 Biscay 1944

References

 Government of Canada Ships' Histories - HMCS Restigouche

Set index articles on ships
Royal Canadian Navy ship names